Drago Jovović (2 December 1954 – 2002) was a Serbian handball player who competed for Yugoslavia in the 1980 Summer Olympics.

Club career
Jovović started out at Vrbas before moving to Crvenka. He also played for Sloga Doboj, helping the club reach the European Cup Winners' Cup final in the 1983–84 season.

International career
At international level, Jovović represented Yugoslavia at the 1980 Summer Olympics.

References

External links
 

1954 births
2002 deaths
Serbian male handball players
Yugoslav male handball players
Olympic handball players of Yugoslavia
Handball players at the 1980 Summer Olympics
Competitors at the 1979 Mediterranean Games
Mediterranean Games gold medalists for Yugoslavia
Mediterranean Games medalists in handball
RK Vrbas players
RK Crvenka players